The 2021 UEFA Women's Champions League Final was the final match of the 2020–21 UEFA Women's Champions League, the 20th season of Europe's premier women's club football tournament organised by UEFA, and the 12th season since it was renamed from the UEFA Women's Cup to the UEFA Women's Champions League. It was played at Gamla Ullevi in Gothenburg, Sweden on 16 May 2021, between English club Chelsea and Spanish club Barcelona. Due to local restrictions in Sweden caused by the COVID-19 pandemic, the match was played behind closed doors. By advancing to the final, Chelsea became the first club to see its men's and women's teams reach the Champions League final in the same season, having also qualified for the UEFA Champions League final.

Barcelona won the match 4–0 for their first Champions League title. In doing so, they became the first club to have won both men's and women's UEFA Champions League titles – its men's team won the Champions League five times; it was a record Chelsea was also seeking. It was also the largest margin of victory in any single-legged UEFA Women's Champions League Final.

Teams
In the following table, finals until 2009 were in the UEFA Women's Cup era, since 2010 were in the UEFA Women's Champions League era.

Venue

This was the first UEFA club competition final hosted at Gamla Ullevi, and the first hosted in the city of Gothenburg since the 2004 UEFA Cup Final at the Nya Ullevi. The stadium previously hosted matches at UEFA Women's Euro 2013 and the 2009 UEFA European Under-21 Championship.

Host selection
An open bidding process was launched on 28 September 2018 by UEFA to select the venues of the finals of the UEFA Champions League, UEFA Europa League, and UEFA Women's Champions League in 2021. Associations had until 26 October 2018 to express interest, and bid dossiers must be submitted by 15 February 2019.

UEFA announced on 1 November 2018 that two associations had expressed interest in hosting the 2021 UEFA Women's Champions League final. and on 22 February 2019 that one association submitted their dossier by the deadline.

The Czech Football Association expressed interest in nominating Sinobo Stadium in Prague but eventually did not submit a bid.

Gamla Ullevi was selected by the UEFA Executive Committee during their meeting in Baku, Azerbaijan on 29 May 2019.

Road to the final

Note: In all results below, the score of the finalist is given first (H: home; A: away).

Notes

Pre-match

Officials
On 4 May 2021, UEFA named German official Riem Hussein as the referee for the final. Hussein had been a FIFA referee since 2009, and previously officiated at UEFA Women's Euro 2017 and the 2019 FIFA Women's World Cup. She was joined by her compatriot Katrin Rafalski and Sara Telek of Austria as assistant referees. Katalin Kulcsár of Hungary served as the fourth official, while Julia Magnusson of Sweden was the reserve assistant referee. Hussein's fellow countrymen Bastian Dankert and Christian Dingert worked as the video assistant referee and assistant VAR officials, respectively.

Match

Details
A draw was held on 12 March 2021, 12:00 CET (after the quarter-final and semi-final draws), at the UEFA headquarters in Nyon, Switzerland to determine which semi-final winner would be designated as the "home" team for administrative purposes.

See also
2021 UEFA Champions League Final
2021 UEFA Europa League Final
2021 UEFA Super Cup

Notes

References

External links

2021
Final
May 2021 sports events in Europe
International sports competitions in Gothenburg
Football in Gothenburg
International club association football competitions hosted by Sweden
International women's association football competitions hosted by Sweden
2020s in Gothenburg
2021 in Swedish women's football
Chelsea F.C. Women matches
FC Barcelona Femení
Women's Champions League Final
Women's Champions League Final